The Sacramento Observer is an African-American-owned weekly newspaper in Sacramento, California. It serves the African-American community throughout the Sacramento Metropolitan Area. There are an estimated 144,000 African Americans living in Sacramento, according to the 2005 American Community Survey published by the Census. It is distributed every Friday. It is owned and operated by The Observer Media Group, which also publishes SacObserver.com, its online news site.

History 
Dr. William H. Lee, Gino Gladden, and John W. Cole established the Observer on November 22, 1962. Dr. Lee served as owner and publisher of the -year-old newspaper for 52 years. Dr. Lee died in 2019. Playing major roles in the family owned OBSERVER’s tremendous growth, as a modern-day Black newspaper, has been Dr. Lee’s immediate family. The late Mrs. Kathryn Lee (1935-2013), and sons, Larry, Billy and Roderick (deceased), all have served in dedicated leadership roles at THE OBSERVER.  Larry Lee has ascended to the role of OBSERVER Publisher and President.

The Observer has grown since its four-page debut in the 1960s. It boasts six sections, covering local, national and international news, business, entertainment, government and politics, education, health and sports. It publishes a local church directory and a calendar of events highlighting African-American events throughout the city.

SacObserver.com 
In 2001, The Observer launched its online news site SacObserver.com. Its first inception featured select articles from The Observer newspaper. The website underwent a redesign where it expanded to seven content channels. The website publishes an online Church Directory, Community-Based Organizations directory, HBCU Directory, Blacks in State Government listing, a Recipes archive and an online Calendar of Events, which lists events throughout Northern California.

Awards 
The Observer has earned many awards, including the coveted John B. Russwurm Trophy for Journalism Excellence, which is considered to be the Pulitzer Prize in African-American newspaper publishing. National Newspaper Publishers Association, an organization of more than 200 Black newspapers throughout the United States of America, awards the 4-foot (1.23 m) Russwurm trophy. The newspaper has won this distinction six times.

Community involvement 
Throughout the years, The Observer has been a strong community leader. The Observer was the catalyst for Sacramento Urban League and the Sacramento Area Black Law Caucus. In the past The Observer has sponsored numerous community events including organizing the Sacramento Black Expo, a yearly, three-day event celebrating African-American history, featuring seminars, workshops, concerts and a marketplace.

External links
 
 Article: The Sacramento Observer: “America’s Number One”
 Article: Observing tradition New generation taking the reins of Sacramento’s venerable black newspaper
 Article: Interview with newspaper CEO Lawrence Lee -- Feb. 2003

African-American newspapers
Weekly newspapers published in California
Mass media in Sacramento, California
Mass media in Sacramento County, California
Publications established in 1962
1962 establishments in California